A car bomb exploded on 21 December 1995 outside a department store in Saddar Bazaar, Peshawar, North-West Frontier Province, Pakistan. It killed at least 32 people and injured over 100 others. Those killed include a daughter and two grandchildren of the Governor of North-West Frontier Province, Khurshid Ali Khan.

References

1995 murders in Pakistan
20th-century mass murder in Pakistan
Attacks on buildings and structures in 1995
1995 bombing
Attacks on shops
Car and truck bombings in Pakistan
December 1995 crimes
December 1995 events in Asia
1995 bombing
Improvised explosive device bombings in 1995
1995
Mass murder in 1995
1995 bombing
Terrorist incidents in Pakistan in 1995
Building bombings in Pakistan